Yoon Son-ha (born November 17, 1975, Jeonju, Jeollabuk-do, South Korea) is a South Korean actress, singer and television personality (gaijin tarento). She is signed onto Sony Music Japan's SME Records division. Since making her debut in the MBC dramas, she has acted in Korea and Japan, probably due to her fluency in Japanese as well as in her native Korean, where she has gained popularity from starring in the Fuji TV drama, Fighting Girl with co-star Kyoko Fukada. In Japan, however, she is known as Yun Sona (ユンソナ).

Marriage and controversy 

On July 4, 2006, Yoon announced that she got engaged to a Korean entrepreneur who lives in Seoul. and she moved her base of operation to South Korea.

Filmography

TV series 
 1994: KBS Salut D'Amour (Love Greeting)
 MBC Ready Go!
 MBC New Nonstop
 1996: KBS Papa
 1998: King of the Wind (Path of the Great Dynasty)
 1999: MBC Did We Really Love?
 2000: NHK Mouichido Kisu
 2001: Snowflakes (KBS)
 2001: Fuji TV Fighting Girl
 2002: NTV Byoki Wa Nemuranai (Night Hospital / Illness Doesn't Sleep)
 2003: TBS Good Luck!!
 2003: NTV Ashita Tenki Ni Naare
 2007: SBS Dear Lover
 2010: KBS The Fugitive: Plan B
 2013: SBS The Heirs
 2015: SBS Enchanting Neighbor
 2016: SBS Six Flying Dragons
2017: KBS Hit the Top

Films 
 2006 Kisarazu Cats Eye: World series (TBS)
 'Last Love' (2007)

Discography

Studio album 
 2005 비인 (悲忍)

Singles 
 "會いたい"
 "Song Bird"
 "Reach for the Sky"

References 

 http://joynews.inews24.com/home/view/joynews_view.php?g_menu=700100&g_serial=253525 
 http://www.newsen.com/news_view.php?uid=200903271545081001 
 http://www.newsen.com/news_view.php?uid=200903290105571001 
  
 http://www.newsen.com/news_view.php?uid=200907090958541001 
 http://www.asiae.co.kr/news/view.htm?idxno=2009072908531742530 
 http://nownews.seoul.co.kr/news/newsView.php?id=20090729603084

External links 
 Official Website 

1975 births
Expatriate television personalities in Japan
Living people
Sony Music Entertainment Japan artists
South Korean film actresses
South Korean television actresses
21st-century South Korean singers
21st-century South Korean women singers